Vachellia nilotica subsp. adstringens is a perennial tree.  It is not listed as being threatened. Some common names for it are cassie, piquants blancs and piquant lulu.  Its geographic distribution includes Africa, Asia, the Indian Ocean area and the Middle East.

Vachellia nilotica subsp. adstringens is difficult to tell apart from Vachellia karoo without seeing the seed pods.

Uses

Wood
The tree's wood heartwood has a density of about 0.945 g/cm3 and its sapwood has a density of about 0.827 g/cm3.

References

External links
 www.hear.org

nilotica subsp. adstringens
Trees of Africa
Flora of Asia
Plant subspecies